In 2013–14, Vitória de Setúbal will compete in the Primeira Liga, Taça de Portugal and Taça da Liga.

Primeira Liga

League table

Taça da Liga

Third round

Group A

Taça de Portugal

Current squad
As of 16 August 2013.

References

Vitória F.C. seasons
Vitoria de Setubal